A list of horror films released in 1973.

References

Sources

 

 

 
 

Lists of horror films by year